"Next" is a song by Puerto Rican reggaetón recording artist Ivy Queen. The song was written by Queen and Peter Nieto and released as a stand-alone single on September 11, 2020.

The song peaked at number nineteen on the Billboard Latin Digital Songs chart and number twenty-four on the Billboard Latin Rhythm Airplay chart.

Background
In February 2020, Queen embarked on the Raiz No Rama World Tour, which was forced to end due to the Covid pandemic. Following this, Queen continued to work from home, recording new music.

Critical reception
According to CNN en Español's Patricia Borjas, the song gives women a message of empowerment, claiming it to be dedicated to women. Vanessa Odreman for E! News called "Next" Queen's new anthem.

Chart performance

References

2020 singles
Ivy Queen songs
Spanish-language songs
Songs written by Ivy Queen
Songs with feminist themes